Otto Kuttelwascher is an Austrian Righteous Among the Nations.

He lived in Vienna, together with his wife Hermine "Mina" Kuttelwascher and three children. A Jewish family, 2 girls and their parents, was living next to them.
 
The father of the Jewish family died under the pressure that the Nazis put on him. One of the daughters was sent to a collective apartment for Jews. Otto and Hermine offered the other girl, Erna Kohn, to stay at their apartment. She survived the war and later emigrated to America.

External links
 Otto Kuttelwascher – his activity to save Jews' lives during the Holocaust, at Yad Vashem website
 http://www.gedenkdienst.org/deutsch/gerechte/inhalt.php
 Jewish friend hiding in apartment in Vienna

Austrian Righteous Among the Nations
People from Vienna